The Burnham Tavern is a historic tavern at 14 Colonial Way in Machias, Maine, United States.  Built in 1770, it is one of the oldest surviving buildings in the Machias area, and is known for its locally significant role in the American Revolutionary War. The tavern is operated as the Burnham Tavern Museum by the Hannah Weston Chapter of the Daughters of the American Revolution (DAR). Featuring late 18th period furnishings, the house includes artifacts from the 1775 Battle of Machias, the first naval battle of the Revolution.  The building was listed on the National Register of Historic Places in 1973.

Description and history
The Burnham Tavern is located on the south side of Colonial Way in downtown Machias, just south of its junction with Free Street.  It is a rectangular two-story wood-frame structure, oriented to face east, presenting a side to the street.  The roof is gambrel, with a clerestory section of windows on the second floor.  The main facade is five bays wide, and the building has a large central chimney.  The entry vestibule has a distinctive staircase that branches left and right, providing independent access to the second-floor bedrooms.  There are parlor rooms on either side of the chimney, and a kitchen with large fireplace taking up most of the western half of the building.

English settlers first arrived in the Machias area in 1763, and the tavern was built in 1770 by Job Burnham.  It is the only building in the Machias area with a documented connection to the American Revolutionary War, as it was used as a meeting place by the local militia, particularly during the events that led to the 1775 Battle of Machias, one of the first naval encounters of the war.  It was also used as a hospital for treating the wounded of both sides in the battle, and artifacts related to the capture of the Margaretta during this battle are on display.  The building continued to act as a major local social meeting point into the 20th century.

See also
National Register of Historic Places listings in Washington County, Maine

References

External links

 Burnham Tavern Museum

Houses completed in 1770
Museums in Washington County, Maine
Historic house museums in Maine
American Revolutionary War museums
Taverns in Maine
Taverns in the American Revolution
Daughters of the American Revolution museums
Machias, Maine
Houses in Washington County, Maine
National Register of Historic Places in Washington County, Maine
1770 establishments in Maine
Drinking establishments on the National Register of Historic Places in Maine